The 1963–64 Wichita Shockers men's basketball team represented Wichita State University in the 1963–64 NCAA University Division men's basketball season. They played their home games at the University of Wichita Field House. They were in their 19th season as a member of the Missouri Valley Conference and 58th season overall. They were led by head coach Ralph Miller in his 13th and final season at the school. They finished the season 23–5, 10–2 in Missouri Valley play to finish in first place. They received a bid to the 1964 NCAA Tournament and advanced to the regional finals before falling to Kansas State.

Roster

Schedule and results

|-
!colspan=12 style=""| Regular season

|-
!colspan=9 style="" | 1964 NCAA Tournament

Rankings

Awards and honors
Dave Stallworth – Consensus First-team All-American

References

Wichita State Shockers men's basketball seasons
Wichita
Wichita
Shock
Shock